Governor's Inn is a historic inn at Maumee, Ohio, United States. It was built in 1836 by Levi Beebe. Before it served as an inn, the building was named the Commercial Building and held local stores and a post office. When the Miami and Erie Canal opened, it became a lodge for canal and stagecoach travelers. The inn went by many names before the Governor's Inn, including the Neely House, the Eagle, the Schieley House, the Bismark, the Seurin Hotel, the Langley Inn, and the Old Plantation Inn. It is now home to a whisky bar.

In 1974, the Governor's Inn was listed on the National Register of Historic Places, qualifying because of its historically significant architecture.  It was the fifth place in Maumee to receive this designation.

References

External links

owner's website

Hotel buildings on the National Register of Historic Places in Ohio
Commercial buildings completed in 1836
Buildings and structures in Lucas County, Ohio
National Register of Historic Places in Lucas County, Ohio